Kevin J. Sweeney is an American prelate of the Catholic Church who has been serving as bishop of the Diocese of Paterson in New Jersey since 2020.

Life and career

Early life and education
A native of the New York borough of Queens, Kevin Sweeney was born on January 10, 1970, to James and Agnes (Blewitt) Sweeney. He has a sister, Marie Shanahan, and a brother, Brendan. His parents are immigrants from Ireland. Kevin Sweeney grew up in St. Luke's Parish in Whitestone, Queens, and attended Cathedral Preparatory School and Seminary in Queens from 1984 to 1988. Sweeney played on the high-school baseball team, excelling as an infielder, outfielder and pitcher. He was inducted into the school's Hall of Fame in 2013.

After high school, Sweeney entered the Cathedral Seminary House of Formation in Douglaston, New York.  He then studied at St. John's University in New York City, where he earned a Bachelor of Philosophy degree in 1992. He then entered the Seminary of the Immaculate Conception in Huntington, New York, where he received a Master of Divinity degree in theology. During his time at the seminary, he spent a pastoral year at St. Agatha's Parish in Brooklyn.

Ordination and ministry
On June 28, 1997, Sweeney was ordained a priest for the Diocese of Brooklyn by Bishop Thomas V. Daily. His first assignment was as parochial vicar at St. Nicholas of Tolentine Parish in Jamaica, Queens, from 1997 to 2003. He was then assigned to Our Lady of Sorrows Parish in Corona, Queens, serving there from 2003 to 2004.In 2004, Bishop Nicholas DiMarzio named Sweeney as diocesan vocations director, a position he held until 2010. During this time, he also served as the first director of the Pope John Paul II House of Discernment in Brooklyn. In January 2010, Sweeney was appointed pastor of St. Michael's Parish in Brooklyn's Sunset Park section.

Bishop of Paterson
Pope Francis appointed Sweeney as bishop of the Diocese of Paterson on April 15, 2020. He was consecrated by Bishop Joseph W. Tobin on July 1, 2020. Attendance at the ceremony was limited to about 100 people due to restrictions from the COVID-19 pandemic.

See also

 Catholic Church hierarchy
 Catholic Church in the United States
 Historical list of the Catholic bishops of the United States
 List of Catholic bishops of the United States
 Lists of patriarchs, archbishops, and bishops

References

External links
Roman Catholic Diocese of Paterson Official Site

 

1970 births 
Living people
21st-century Roman Catholic bishops in the United States
American Roman Catholic clergy of Irish descent
People from Queens, New York
Bishops appointed by Pope Francis